John McPherson (28 February 1867 – 2 April 1957) was a Scottish footballer who played as a centre half for Heart of Midlothian and Nottingham Forest.

Career
Born in Motherwell, McPherson played in Scotland for Heart of Midlothian from July 1888 to June 1891, winning the Scottish Cup with the Edinburgh club in 1891. He moved south of the border to play for Nottingham Forest, but was briefly loaned back to Hearts from May to August 1892. He then returned to Nottingham Forest where he played for the best part of a decade, becoming club captain. He also won the FA Cup with Forest in 1898, scoring in the final in a 3–1 win over rivals Derby County. He returned to Scotland to complete his career with his hometown club, Motherwell, in the 1901–02 season.

He made his only appearance for Scotland in 1891.

Later life
He moved to Canada in 1910 and settled in Regina, Saskatchewan working for the City of Regina. In 1950 he moved to Victoria, British Columbia where he died in 1957.

Honours
Heart of Midlothian
 Scottish Cup: 1890–91

Nottingham Forest
 FA Cup: 1898

Notes

References

External links
 

1867 births
1957 deaths
Footballers from Motherwell
Scottish footballers
Heart of Midlothian F.C. players
Nottingham Forest F.C. players
Motherwell F.C. players
Scottish Football League players
English Football League players
Scottish emigrants to Canada
Scotland international footballers
Association football midfielders
Association football central defenders
FA Cup Final players
Football Alliance players